Sverre Hjelle Økland (born 19 June 1993) is a Norwegian footballer who plays as a midfielder for Eliteserien club Ullensaker/Kisa. He started his senior career with Aalesund in 2009, moving to Løv-Ham in 2011 for its final season (merged into FK Fyllingsdalen), then moved to Kristiansund BK in July 2012, where he stayed for seven seasons.

Career statistics

Honours

Club
Kristiansund
1. divisjon (1): 2016

References

External links

1993 births
Living people
Sportspeople from Ålesund
Norwegian footballers
Association football midfielders
Aalesunds FK players
Løv-Ham Fotball players
Kristiansund BK players
Ullensaker/Kisa IL players
Norwegian First Division players
Eliteserien players